Heliconia willisiana is a species of plant in the family Heliconiaceae It is endemic to Ecuador.

References

Flora of Ecuador
willisiana
Data deficient plants
Taxonomy articles created by Polbot